Andrew Mills (born 12 December 1993) is an English footballer who plays as a goalkeeper for Östersund.

Career
After being released by Macclesfield Town in 2014, Mills joined Swedish sixth-tier side Arnäs IF. He then had spells playing for Division 3 side Friska Viljor and Division 2 side IFK Östersund. In July 2017, he joined Allsvenskan side Östersund on loan before making the deal permanent the following year. On 18 October 2020, he made his professional league debut, starting in a 3–2 win over Sirius. On 11 October 2021, Mills rejoined Östersund after a spell back in the UK.

References

External links

Swedish football stats

1994 births
Living people
Association football goalkeepers
English footballers
Footballers from Liverpool
Macclesfield Town F.C. players
New Mills A.F.C. players
Buxton F.C. players
Cammell Laird 1907 F.C. players
Salford City F.C. players
Newcastle Town F.C. players
Friska Viljor FC players
IFK Östersund players
Östersunds FK players
Allsvenskan players
Division 2 (Swedish football) players
Expatriate footballers in Sweden
English expatriate footballers
English expatriate sportspeople in Sweden